Glória Maria Cláudia Pires de Morais (born 23 August 1963) is a Brazilian actress. She is best known for her roles in TV Globo telenovelas such as Dancin' Days, Vale Tudo, Mulheres de Areia and O Rei do Gado. She is also known for starring in films such as Academy Award-nominated O Quatrilho, box-office hit If I Were You and its sequel, and Lula, Son of Brazil, which is the second most expensive Brazilian film of all time, after Nosso Lar.

In 2013, she starred in the movie Reaching for the Moon along with Miranda Otto, and directed by Bruno Barreto.

In 2013, she was also honoured by Forbes Brazil as one of Brazil's most influential persons being ranked in the 28th position out of the 30 short-listed.

Biography
Pires was born on 23 August 1963 in Rio de Janeiro. She is the daughter of producer Elza Pires and actor Antônio Carlos Pires. She has a sister named Linda Pires, a therapist. She is of Native Brazilian and Portuguese descent.

Career

1970s
Glória made her debut as an actress at the age of 5, on the telenovela A Pequena Órfã, broadcast on the now-defunct TV Excelsior. She initially participated only in the show's opening sequence, but director Dionísio Azevedo would later cast her to play a minor character. On her first day of shooting, however, she experienced a nasal hemorrhage and was removed from the telenovela. Later, when the lead actress Patrícia Ayres dropped out due to contractual reasons, Glória had a second chance by dubbing Ayres' voice at such a young age.

In 1971, Glória made a screen test for the role of Zizi in the Globo telenovela O Primeiro Amor, but was rejected. In 1972 she made her debut in the network's Caso Especial episode "Sombra de Suspeita". That same year she made her telenovela debut starring in a minor role in Janete Clair's Selva de Pedra. It became the only telenovela in the history of Brazil to reach 100 percent of share. In 1973 Glória landed a tiny role in Clair's O Semideus. She also acted alongside her father and Chico Anysio on the comedy program Chico City, broadcast on Rede Globo. She would act in several other comedy programs. In 1976, Glória starred in Clair's Duas Vidas, where she learned a lot from senior actor Luiz Gustavo, who played her father in the telenovela. In 1977, disappointed with the roles offered to her, she decided to take a break from acting.

In 1978, Glória learned from her father that director Daniel Filho was searching for an actress to play Sônia Braga's teenager daughter in his telenovela Dancin' Days. After much deliberation, she decided to take the screen test for the role. The telenovela was a big hit and Glória won the Best Newcomer Award from the São Paulo Association of Art Critics. During the telenovela's original broadcast, she faced censorship from the Juvenile Court, which prohibited her from giving interviews based on her controversial opinions about the school system. In June 1979 Glória landed the lead role in Cabocla opposite her husband Fábio Jr. She was unable to shoot the final scenes of the telenovela due to a severe stress crisis that kept her hospitalized for two weeks.

1980s
In 1980, after she left the hospital, Glória decided to change her appearance, cutting and lightening her hair. Her next telenovelas were Água Viva and As Três Marias, an adaptation of Clarice Lispector's novel of the same name. She made a deal with Globo so that she could act in her first feature film after the end of this telenovela. In 1981, Glória starred in Fábio Barreto's Índia, a filha do Sol as Putkoy, a Native Brazilian who falls in love with a white soldier played by Nuno Leal Maia. This was also Barreto's first feature film.

In 1982, Glória took a break from acting due to her first pregnancy. In 1983 she returned to telenovelas with Louco Amor as newly graduated journalist Cláudia. During this telenovela, Nelson Pereira dos Santos invited her to play Heloísa, Graciliano Ramos' wife, in his film Memoirs of Prison. This was her second collaboration with Fábio Barreto, which starred as Siqueira Campos. Glória attended the film's premiere alongside real life Heloísa. In 1984, she acted in the telenovela Partido Alto. The following year would mark Globo's 20th anniversary, and the mini-series O Tempo e o Vento, an adaptation of Érico Veríssimo's novel of same name, would be produced to celebrate it. After she learned of the intentions of Paulo José, the director of the mini-series, to cast her as the main lead Ana Terra, Glória convinced Globo's head director Daniel Filho that she could reconcile the shooting of the telenovela and the mini-series.

After O Tempo e o Vento, Glória starred in her second film, Francisco Ramalho Júnior's Besame Mucho, alongside Antônio Fagundes and José Wilker. She moved to São Paulo for two months with daughter Cléo Pires in order to shoot the film. In 1987 she starred in the telenovela Direito de Amar and in the film The Long Haul. In 1988, she postponed her honeymoon with second husband Orlando Morais in order to play Maria de Fátima, Regina Duarte's daughter and antagonist, in Vale Tudo.

1990s and 2000s
In 1990, Glória starred in Mico Preto, followed by O Dono do Mundo. In 1993, after the birth of her second daughter, Glória starred in Mulheres de Areia playing twin sisters. She received the Troféu Imprensa Award for Best Actress for her performance in the telenovela. In 1994 she starred in the mini-series Memorial de Maria Moura, adapted from the Raquel de Queiroz' novel of the same name. It won Glória another award from the São Paulo Association of Art Critics and was shown in various international markets under the international title Merciless Land. In 1995 she starred in O Quatrilho, her third collaboration with Fábio Barreto. Glória received several best actress awards and the film was nominated for the Academy Award for Best Foreign Language Film.

In 1996, Glória starred in O Rei do Gado with Patrícia Pillar, her co-star in O Quatrilho. In 1997 she starred as the main lead in Anjo Mau. It was one of the highest-rating telenovelas ever in the 6 p.m. timeslot. The following year, Glória moved to Los Angeles with her family to seek privacy. After living a whole year in California, Glória starred in Suave Veneno.

In 2000, Glória gave birth to her third daughter. The following year she starred in the film adaptation of A Partilha, a play by Miguel Falabella. Just like the play, the film was also a critical and commercial success. In 2002, Glória starred in Desejos de Mulher, one of the lowest-rating telenovelas in the history of Globo. The following year, she moved with her family to Goiás, the native state of her husband, living among a ranch and an apartment. In 2004, she gave birth to Bento, her fourth child and first son.

In 2005, Glória's father died of complications of Parkinson's disease. That same year she filmed Daniel Filho's If I Were You alongside Tony Ramos. It became one of the highest-grossing Brazilian films since the Retomada,  selling more than 4 million tickets. After the flop of Desejos de Mulher, she returned to telenovelas with the 2005 hit Belíssima, alongside Fernanda Montenegro.

In 2007 she starred in the Daniel Filho-directed Primo Basílio, an adaptation of the José Maria de Eça de Queiroz novel Cousin Bazilio. The following year she starred opposite Tony Ramos in Paraíso Tropical. In early 2008, once again seeking privacy, she moved to Paris with her family. In 2009 she released Se Eu Fosse Você 2, which became the highest-grossing Brazilian film of the decade, and starred in Lula, Son of Brazil, a biopic about President Luiz Inácio Lula da Silva, marking her fourth collaboration with Fábio Barreto and the first with her daughter Cléo. She also starred in É Proibido Fumar

Glória announced that she would release her biography before returning to Paris on 8 March 2010. The book 40 Anos de Glória, written by Eduardo Nassife and Fábio Fabrício Fabretti, will mark the 40 years of her career.

In 2013, she starred the movie Reaching for the Moon along with Miranda Otto, the film follows the real love story between the American poet Elizabeth Bishop and Brazilian architect Lota de Macedo Soares. Set in Petrópolis, during the years of 1950 and 1960, the story coincides with the emergence of Bossa Nova and the construction and inauguration of the capital Brasilia. The film deals with the story of these two women and their trajectories.

Personal life
In the 1970s, Glória dated Chico Anysio's son Nizo Neto. From 1979 to 1983 she was married to singer and actor Fábio Jr, father of her oldest daughter, Cléo Pires (born 2 October 1982), also an actress. She has been married to singer Orlando Morais since April 1988, with whom she had Antônia Morais (born 7 August 1992), Ana (born 10 July 2000), and Bento (born 4 October 2004).

Filmography

Film

Television

Awards and nominations 
Over the 40 years of her professional career, Glória Pires has won numerous awards. In 1979 she won the São Paulo Association of Art Critics Award for Most Promising Television Actress for Dancin' Days. In 1989, 1992, and 1994, she won the APCA trophy for Best Television Actress for Vale Tudo, O Dono do Mundo, and Mulheres de Areia, respectively. In 1995 Glória won the Havana Film Festival Best Actress Award for her performance in O Quatrilho. In 1996 she received the APCA trophy for Best Film Actress for O Quatrilho, a feat she would repeat in 2010 with É Proibido Fumar. In 2009 Glória won the Festival de Brasília Best Actress Award for her performance in É Proibido Fumar.

References

External links

1963 births
Living people
Brazilian film actresses
Brazilian telenovela actresses
Actresses from Rio de Janeiro (city)
20th-century Brazilian actresses
21st-century Brazilian actresses